Ex-Wife (Byvshaya zhena) is a 2013 Russian television series whose lead character, Natasha, played by Nelli Uvarova, works in a government department that seeks to collect unpaid alimony.  The bailiffs of the office pursue deadbeat fathers (there's no example of a woman owing alimony) in a Russian city.  In the first episode, Natasha quits a singing gig in order to join the department as an intern, and hopes to collect from her own ex-husband.  Real-life tough guy (a mixed martial artist) Oleg Taktarov plays as Natasha's protective boss.

In a review of Russian television shows, The Verge called it "most inventive twist on a cop show".

It has twelve episodes in its single season.

Cast
Characters include:
Natalia (Natasha) Sergeyevna Melnik, played by Nelli Uvarova
Victor Mikhailovich Lukin, Natasha's boss, played by Oleg Taktarov 
Kirill Valentinovich Popov, Natasha's ex-husband, played by Yuriy Baturin
Galina Borisovna, Natasha's friend who hired her into the department, played by Viktoriya Fisher
co-worker Anzhela Kislevskaia, played by Kristina Babushkina
internet-savvy student co-worker Piotr (Petya) Smyslov, played by Grigoriy Kalinin
Danila, Natasha's son, played by Sasha Drobitko

It is a Russian World Series / Russian Golden Series production.

References

External links
Byvshaya zhena, at IMDB

2013 Russian television series debuts
2013 Russian television series endings
2010s Russian television series
Russian crime television series
Russian drama television series
Russian police procedural television series
Works about debt
Debt collection
Channel One Russia original programming